The Rock Gym is a historic gym located at 45 Forest Avenue in Elberton, Georgia, United States. The gym was built in 1941 and initially served as a National Guard armory. The Elbert County School System also occupied the building and used it for high school basketball games, commencement ceremonies, school dances, and other events. The school system closed the gym in the 1990s, and it was vacant until 2003, when the city considered demolishing the building. The Elbert County Historical Society spent the next nine years restoring the building, and it reopened in 2012 as the Elberton-Elbert County Conference Center and Museum.

The gym was listed on the National Register of Historic Places in 1998.

References

Commercial buildings completed in 1940
Sports venues on the National Register of Historic Places in Georgia (U.S. state)
Buildings and structures in Elbert County, Georgia
National Register of Historic Places in Elbert County, Georgia